Our House is a 1965 Soviet drama film directed by Vasily Pronin.

Plot 
The film tells about the Ivanov family. Three sons have become adults, they are going to leave the house, and their parents and younger brother will have to find the strength in themselves to put up with this.

Cast 
 Anatoliy Papanov as Father (as A. Papanov)
 Nina Sazonova as Mother (as N. Sazonova)
 Ivan Lapikov as Uncle Kolya (as I. Lapikov)
 Vadim Beroev as Nikolai (as V. Beroyev)
 Aleksei Loktev as Volodya (as A. Loktev)
 Gennadiy Bortnikov
 Aleksandr Sesin
 Taysia Dodina as Nina (as T. Dodina)
 Nelli Kornienko as Tanya (as N. Korniyenko)
 Nikolai Barmin

References

External links 
 

1965 films
1960s Russian-language films
Soviet drama films
1965 drama films